Stade Omnisports is located in Sikasso, Mali. It is used mostly for football and serves as the home stadium of AS Tata National.  The stadium has a capacity of 20,000 people and was built in 2001.

Football venues in Mali
Sikasso
Sports venues completed in 2001
2001 establishments in Mali